Saskatchewan Savings Bonds (SSB) were bond securities issued by the province of Saskatchewan. As of June 2010, the product is no longer offered. SSBs' principal and interest are backed by the Province of Saskatchewan. The SSBs were available from financial institutions, credit unions, and investment dealers. The minimum purchase value was $100 and the maximum value was $200,000. As of April 2009, there were $247.2 million in SSBs outstanding.

Unlike the Canada Savings Bond, SSBs were only sold to residents of Saskatchewan.

References

External links
Saskatchewan Savings Bonds

Banking in Canada
Savings Bond
Government bonds issued by Canada